Mackay Lacus is the seventh largest of a number of hydrocarbon seas and lakes found on Saturn's largest moon, Titan. The lake is composed of liquid methane and ethane, and was detected by the Cassini space probe.

Mackay Lacus is located at coordinates 78.32°N and 97.53°W on Titan's globe and is 180 km in length. It is named after Lake Mackay in Western Australia.

Notes

References

Lakes of Titan (moon)